, also known as Doraemon, Nobita and the Underworld Adventure, is a 1984 Japanese animated science fantasy film which premiered on March 17, 1984, in Japan, based on the fifth volume of the same name of the Doraemon Long Stories series. The fifth in series, it was the first to incorporate computer graphics technology. The film was watched by more than 3 million people and generated a revenue of 1.65 billion yen. It became the highest grossing animated film of 1984. By its release, Doraemon became the first and the only franchise to have 2 back-to-back highest-grossing animated films of the year. A remake of this film was released in Japan on March 10, 2007, entitled Doraemon: Nobita's New Great Adventure into the Underworld. It is the 5th Doraemon film.

Plot
Nobita has been vaguely indulging in fantasy of magic and wizardry for the past few days, something that Doramon thinks is ridiculous. One day, when Nobita takes out the trash, he finds a stone statue that looks exactly like Doraemon, and takes it home, confusing Doraemon as well. Doraemon eventually got curious and want to know more about magic, and did some research about it with Dekisugi. It seems like magic was real in history, but because it's seen to be the 'power of the devil', they were targeted and became extinct. Later, Nobita finds another stone statue, this one looks like him. He wonders if the statues are actually themselves from another time or world, so they decide to leave it alone. However, at midnight during a storm, the statues somehow enters the house, and appears in a different pose. 

Nobita requests Doraemon to give him the Moshimo-box and wishes for the world to become a place where the use of magic is possible. Witchcraft replaces science and technology and everyone makes use of it on their daily lives. However, neither Nobita nor Doraemon can use them, finding it much harder to do than they imagine. This causes Nobita to do poorly in school where magic was taught. Back home, Doraemon encourages Nobita to learn magic, but when Shizuka arrives, he accidentally lifts her skirt using magic, when suddenly an earthquake happened. According to Shizuka, frequent earthquakes are related to a hypothesis of a doctor of magic, that "the demon world is approaching". Wanting to meet this professor to learn more about this world, Nobita, Doraemon, and Shizuka went to search for him using a flying broom, while Doraemon uses a Bamboo copter, something that's considered foreign in this world.

They search the hill behind the school, where they spot Suneo and Gian bullying a monkey, but it turns out it can use magic, burning their brooms and causing them to fall. The group helps them to get into a house, which is guarded by a living statue and a tree. It's Professor Mangetsu house, who helps them with his assistant, a girl named Miyoko. Professor Mangetsu also tells the group about his research, where he suspects that the demons of the demon world are currently planning to invade the earth, and if nothing is done, humankind will be destroyed by demons with unimaginable magical power, with the earthquakes and huge typhoons that are approaching the world are the precursors. Realizing how dangerous this world is, Nobita and Doraemon planned to return the world to normal, but found out that the Moshimo-box was thrown away by Nobita's mother. Worse, the news reveals that a typhoon is coming towards Japan. After discussing that night, Nobita and Doraemon decides they must solve the problem in this world. They went to professor Mangetsu's house, but the house seem to disappear overnight. They did find a cat nearby that seem to be interested in them, so they take it home.

Without professor Mangetsu, Nobita does his own research about this world by asking his teacher about the devil. He learns that the Devil seem to come from another world called the Underworld according to professor Mangetsu. Meanwhile back at home, the cat is somehow able to do Nobita's homework, completing it without trouble. That night, the sky is covered with thick clouds, but the cat wakes both Nobita and Doraemon. When the moon briefly shines onto the cat, it transforms into Miyoko. She reveals that she and professor Mangetsu were attacked by demons, and she was cursed into a cat, with the spell disappearing only when she's under the moonlight. Nobita and Doraemon takes Miyoko over the clouds with the Bamboo copter, and she begs both of them to save the world from the devil in the demon world, much to their surprise, but then Miyoko uses a crystal ball to reveal the 'five heroes who will defeat the demon king', they see Nobita, Doraemon, Shizuka, Suneo, and Gian.

The next day, the typhoon had got worse, and school is suspended. It seems natural disasters got worse and worse around the world. This convinces Nobita and Doraemon to try to defeat the devil to save the world. Worried about Miyoko, the two went through the typhoon and finds her near where professor Mangetsu's house, hiding from a demon and the monkey from earlier. Using the Translate Cake, Doraemon and Nobita can understand Miyoko even when she's a cat, who explains that she can draw a six angle star barrier that makes them unable to be found by demons. However, when Shizuka was spotted by the demon, the group has to fight to safe her. Miyoko fares well at first, until the monkey disarms her sword. Doraemon eventually uses the Reverse Cloak to deflect the demon's spell back, destroying it and the monkey. After the fight, Gian and Suneo also joins the group after being informed about the situation earlier.

Miyoko grabs a book that contains information of the devil's world, while Doraemon uses a wizard hat with a star pattern as they use a flying carpet to reach the devil's world from space. After experiencing more oddities of the magic world like being able to breathe in space, the carpet having a lower floor room, and seeing rabbits on the moon, the group gets close to the devil's world, but the flying carpet got pulled into it's layer of black flame. They made it through, but they had to abandon the flying carpet with the Bamboo copter as it got burned. They landed on an arctic landscape, and despite Miyoko able to conjure fire, she's not powerful enough to maintain it. When the group got stranded in a freezing blizzard, Nobita fell asleep, but his mumblings reminds Doraemon to use the Abekobe Cream to warm them up through the storm.

Next, they came across the sea, where Miyoko's book say there's mermaids that lures everyone with their voice to be eaten by a monsterous whale. Doraemon gives the group ear cover, but the mermaid's voices went through it. Just as the group seem to succumb to it, the annoyed Gian starts to sing loudly, scaring the mermaids away and returning the group back into their senses. Afterwards they got into a large open plains where it's said one cannot leave once they enter it, and houses some demonic animals that can attack and devour them. The group initially uses a tree as their reference, but they realize the trees are moving, making them go in a circle. Doraemon then uses the Light-The-Way Beam to guide them through the right way.

Finally, they got into a forest, where they hide from a beast using Miyoko's barrier, Doraemon's Pebble Hat, and a rocket to guide them, but the Bamboo copters ran out of batteries, making the group walk to the Devil's castle. Using Doraemon's Pebble Hat once again, the group encounters the Devil himself. Miyoko tells everyone to throw golden darts at the "Devil's heart" to defeat it, but to their surprise, it didn't work. Overpowered by the devil and his demons, Miyoko gives Nobita one of the scrolls containing the information of the devil's world before she, Shizuka, Gian, and Suneo got captured, with only Nobita and Doraemon escaping. Though initially depressed, Doraemon got an idea of using the Time Machine to stop their past selves from using the Moshimo-box to bring the magic world into reality. However, the devil knows their plan, and sends Demaon the demon to stop them. Despite Nobita able to use the broom to fly, the two eventually got petrified into stone statues, which their past selves find in the beginning of the story.

However, they're saved by the sudden appearance of Dorami, who detects the danger with one of her gadgets. She gives her Moshimo-box so Nobita can restore the world back to normal, but they realize that Miyoko and their friends are still captured, and it will stay that way because of the parallel universe. When they use the time machine to return to the devil's world, Nobita takes out the scroll that Miyoko gave her, and realizes that the Devil's heart is not in his body, but it turns out to be a star in the underworld space. They managed to rescue the others along with professor Mangetsu before the demons cook them, and through luck, avoids capture because a demon mistook the stars on Doraemon's hat as a symbol of high rank. They return to the burnt Magic Carpet, restore it with the Time Cloth, and made their way back to space to find the Devil's heart and destroy it. 

During their search, they're chased by the devil and his army of demons. They turn stars into giant fireballs that attacks the group, but with Miyoko's curse lifted, she's able to send them away with a spell. When more stars starts attacking them, Professor Mangetsu steers the carpets to dodge them, and even with everyone using Doraemon and Dorami's weapon gadgets, they barely manage to hang on, with Suneo almost falling at one point. Finally, they managed to spot the Devil's heart, and when Gian throws the golden dart at it, both the heart and the devil himself turns aflame, and got destroyed.

With the world saved, the group rebuilds professor Mangetsu's house, and Nobita says farewell to Miyoko before turning the word back to normal with the Moshimo-box. As Nobita takes a walk, he heard his friends talking the events of the devil's world as a dream or a fantasy, and when Nobita tried to cast a spell, Shizuka's skirt got lifted like how he did when he was learning spell, but dismissed it, thinking it's just the wind that caused it.

Cast

Music
 sung by Kyōko Koizumi.

References

External links
Doraemon The Movie 25th page 

Films directed by Tsutomu Shibayama
1984 films
1984 anime films
Nobita's Great Adventure into the Underworld
Films about magic and magicians
Films scored by Shunsuke Kikuchi
Films set in Croatia
1980s children's animated films
Japanese children's fantasy films
Toho films